The 2020 Georgia Southern Eagles football team represented Georgia Southern University during the 2020 NCAA Division I FBS football season. The Eagles played their home games at Paulson Stadium in Statesboro, Georgia, and competed in the East Division of the Sun Belt Conference. They were led by third-year head coach Chad Lunsford.

Previous season
The Eagles finished the 2019 season 7–6, 5–3 in Sun Belt play to finish in second place in the East division. The Eagles received an invitation to the Cure Bowl where they were defeated by Liberty 16–23.

Preseason

Sun Belt coaches' poll
The Sun Belt coaches poll was released on August 25, 2020. Georgia Southern was picked to finish 2nd in the East Division with 36 total votes.

Preseason All-Sun Belt teams
The Eagles had five players selected to the preseason All−Sun Belt teams; three from the defense and two from special teams.

Defense

1st team

Raymond Johnson – SR, Defensive Line
Rashad Byrd – R-SR, linebacker
Kenderick Duncan Jr. – R-JR, defensive back

Special teams

1st team

Wesley Kennedy III – SR, return specialist

2nd team

Anthony Beck II – R-SO, punter

Schedule
Georgia Southern had games against Boise State and Ole Miss, which were canceled due to the COVID-19 pandemic. They added a November game with Army on August 11. On October 7, the game against Appalachian State scheduled for October 14 was postponed to December 12 due to COVID-19 positive tests within the Mountaineers' football program.

Game summaries

Campbell

at Louisiana

at Louisiana–Monroe

UMass

at Coastal Carolina

South Alabama

Troy

Texas State

at Army

at Georgia State

\

Florida Atlantic

Appalachian State

Louisiana Tech (New Orleans Bowl)

References

Georgia Southern
Georgia Southern Eagles football seasons
New Orleans Bowl champion seasons
Georgia Southern Eagles football